Nerela Assembly constituency, also known as Narela, is a Vidhan Sabha constituency in the National Capital Territory of Delhi. It is a part of the North West Delhi Lok Sabha constituency.

Overview
From 1993 to 2008, it was Delhi Legislative Assembly segment within the East Delhi Lok Sabha constituency, prior to it, Nerela remained from 1966-93, a Delhi Metropolitan Council segment, with the same constituency. After the delimitation of 2008, Nerela (Narela) is now an Assembly segment within the North West Delhi Lok Sabha constituency.

Members of Legislative Assembly
Key

Election results

2020

2015

2013

2008

2003

References

Assembly constituencies of Delhi